La Castellana, officially the Municipality of La Castellana,  is a 1st class municipality in the province of Negros Occidental, Philippines. According to the 2020 census, it has a population of 79,492 people.

The town is named after the famous "Paseo de la Castellana" in Madrid, Spain.

La Castellana is a rural town at the base of Kanlaon Volcano, known for its natural springs, water falls and scenic spots. It is an agricultural town engaged in sugarcane, rice and banana farming. It is home of many festivals namely Bailes de Luces, Banana Festival and Senior San Vicente Ferrer Feast Day where devotees far and near attend to for healing. Caduhada Spring Resort is a popular tourist spot located in Sitio Mambangon, Barangay Cabacungan.

Geography

Barangays
La Castellana is politically subdivided into 13 barangays.
 Biaknabato
 Cabacungan
 Cabagnaan
 Camandag
 Lalagsan
 Manghanoy
 Mansalanao
 Masulog
 Nato
 Puso
 Robles (Poblacion)
 Sag-Ang
 Talaptap

Climate

Demographics

Economy

References

External links
 [ Philippine Standard Geographic Code]
Philippine Census Information
Local Governance Performance Management System

Municipalities of Negros Occidental